Hector International Airport  is a civil-military public airport three miles (5 km) northwest of Fargo, in Cass County, North Dakota, United States. The busiest airport in North Dakota, it is owned by the City of Fargo Municipal Airport Authority. Fargo Air National Guard Base is located adjacent to the airport.
 
The airport was named after Martin Hector, who first leased, and then donated the original 50 acres of land to the city. Customs service is available for arrivals from Canada and other countries. Hector International has no scheduled passenger airline flights out of the country but has its international title (like many other airports) because of this customs service.

The airport is home to Fargo Air National Guard Base and the Happy Hooligans of the 119th Wing (119 WG), a unit of the North Dakota Air National Guard that operates the MQ-9 Reaper. 
 
The airport was the intended destination for the airplane carrying Buddy Holly, Ritchie Valens, and J.P. Richardson on February 3, 1959. The airplane crashed shortly after takeoff from Mason City, Iowa, killing the three musicians and the pilot.

Facilities and aircraft
Hector International has the longest public runway in North Dakota and can receive Boeing 747s.

For the 12-month period ending December 31, 2021, the airport had 92,980 aircraft operations, an average of 255 per day. In December 2021, there were 203 aircraft based at the airport: 124 single-engine, 52 multi-engine, 22 jet, and 5 helicopters.

The current terminal was built in 1986 and designed by Foss Associates with Thompson Consultants.

In 2008 the airport completed the passenger terminal expansion and update that had begun in October 2006. The $15.5 million project designed by TL Stroh Architects updated the terminal and added a fifth gate, an additional baggage claim and expanded the security checkpoint area. TSA PreCheck was added in 2014.

A passenger terminal expansion study is currently underway. The airport plans to add more boarding gates along with additional seating and food sales spaces.

Airlines and destinations

Passenger

Allegiant Air uses Airbus A320-214s and Airbus A319-111s to Las Vegas, Orlando, Phoenix, Las Angeles, Nashville, and St. Petersburg. American Eagle uses Embrear E175s operated by Envoy Air to Chicago, Dallas, and Phoenix. Delta Air Lines uses Airbus A319-114s and Boeing 737-900ERs to Minneapolis. Delta Connection uses Bombardier CRJ900s operated by SkyWest Airlines to Minneapolis. Frontier Airlines uses Airbus A320-214s and Aribus A320-251Ns to Denver and Orlando. United Express uses Embrear E175s and Bombradier CRJ200s operated by SkyWest Airlines to Chicago and Denver.

Cargo

Statistics

Top destinations

Annual traffic

Commercial airline market share

Ground transportation
As of 2022, there is no public transit service to Hector International Airport. The closest MATBUS bus stop is located over a mile away.

Climate

UFO encounter
On October 1, 1948, the Gorman dogfight, a widely publicized UFO encounter, took place over Hector International Airport.

See also
 Fargo Air Museum

References

External links
Official airport website

Fargo, North Dakota
Airports in North Dakota
Buildings and structures in Cass County, North Dakota